Houses of the Blooded is a roleplaying game designed by John Wick released in July 2008. Its author has described it as the "anti-Dungeons and Dragons roleplaying game," emphasising elements of the fantasy genre that D&D overlooks. Taking a more swords and sorcery approach (rather than "generic fantasy"), the game focuses on romance, intrigue, courtly dangers, and domain management.

Overview
Players tell the story of the tragic and doomed race of Shanri called the  ven. (Both Shanri and the ven previously appeared in Wick's game Enemy Gods.) The ven appear much like humans, but are stronger, faster, and more beautiful. The ven are also emotional powerhouses, emphasising all emotions with capital letters (Love, Hate, Fear, etc.).

The ven were created by a mysterious race they call "the sorcerer-kings." The ven speak of this race with absolute fear, terrified their masters may return one day to enslave them once again.

Ven culture is a complicated system of extremes. "Love" and "Revenge" are the same word in the ven language, both different sides of "obsession." The law is a labyrinth of exceptions, allowing the ven to all but ignore their own laws except when it suits them to obey.

Players in Houses of the Blooded take the roles of nobles responsible for great domains. As they struggle to maintain their own standing, they must solve the troubles that arise in their lands while plotting to expand their own lands. The game system also takes a long-term view, allowing for the passage of time, giving players the opportunity to watch generations pass as characters are born, grow old, and fade away.

Game system

Wick credits the game system to two chief inspirations: octaNe by Jared Sorensen and the FATE System by Evil Hat Productions. Houses of the Blooded uses "aspects," a key element to the FATE System. Also, the use of "wagers"--a mechanic allowing players to take control of the game and the world of Shanri--are inspired by the mechanics of octaNe.

Players roll a pool of six-sided dice, adding the result so as to reach the target number of 10. Before making the roll Players have the option to discard excessive dice as "wagers". If the roll is successful the Player determines if the action succeeded or failed. If they miss the target number the Narrator decides this fact. When successful each wager allows the player to add an additional fact surrounding the result. This allows you to choose to fail in your main attempt, but in an ultimately beneficial way, or conversely succeed in your main intent, but with disastrous consequences.

Fantasy role-playing games
Role-playing games introduced in 2008
Indie role-playing games